Lupeikis is a Lithuanian surname. Notable people with the surname include:

Kęstutis Lupeikis (born 1962), Lithuanian architect and painter
Remigijus Lupeikis (born 1964), Lithuanian cyclist

Lithuanian-language surnames